José Claudeon dos Santos (born 20 March 1982), better known as Bobô, is a Brazilian footballer.

Career
Born in Propriá, Bobô started in his hometown club, Esporte Clube Propriá, moving as an 18-year-old to Portugal, to join Campomaiorense youth ranks.

After several years in Portuguese lower divisions, Bobô made his professional debut for Moreirense on 29 August 2010 in a home win against Estoril Praia. representing the second tier team for two seasons, with more than a dozen league goals. In 2012, he moved to Hungary, joining Vasas, in the Hungarian second tier, scoring only three times in nearly 20 caps.

A year later, Bobô returned to Portugal, joining Boavista in 2013 in the third tier. In January 2014, he had a particular prolific spell, scoring 12 goals in 13 matches sparking interest in his home country. With the return of Boavista to the Primeira Liga, Bobô made his debut in the first tier on 17 August 2014, in a match against Braga. He left Boavista in 2015 to play for AR São Martinho in the Campeonato de Portugal.

Personal life
He is the younger brother of Detinho, a former professional footballer.

References

External links

1982 births
Living people
Sportspeople from Sergipe
Brazilian footballers
Moreirense F.C. players
Vasas SC players
S.C. Campomaiorense players
O Elvas C.A.D. players
Leixões S.C. players
A.D. Sanjoanense players
Boavista F.C. players
AD Fafe players
F.C. Tirsense players
Association football forwards
Liga Portugal 2 players
Primeira Liga players
Expatriate footballers in Portugal
Brazilian expatriate sportspeople in Portugal
Brazilian expatriate sportspeople in Hungary
Expatriate footballers in Hungary